Love, Honor and Behave is a 1920 American silent comedy film directed by F. Richard Jones and Erle C. Kenton and starring Ford Sterling, Phyllis Haver and Marie Prevost.

Cast

References

Bibliography
 Brent E. Walker. Mack Sennett’s Fun Factory: A History and Filmography of His Studio and His Keystone and Mack Sennett Comedies, with Biographies of Players and Personnel. McFarland, 2013.

External links
 

1920 films
1920 comedy films
1920s English-language films
American silent feature films
Silent American comedy films
Films directed by Erle C. Kenton
Films directed by F. Richard Jones
American black-and-white films
First National Pictures films
1920s American films